Little Bras d'Or  is a community in the Canadian province of Nova Scotia, located in the Cape Breton Regional Municipality on Cape Breton County on Cape Breton Island.

Demographics 

References

 Little Bras d'Or on Destination Nova Scotia

Communities in the Cape Breton Regional Municipality
Designated places in Nova Scotia